Weihung is a river of Baden-Württemberg, Germany. It passes through Wain and Illerkirchberg, and flows into the Danube near Ulm.

See also
List of rivers of Baden-Württemberg

Reference

Rivers of Baden-Württemberg
Rivers of Germany